Autoreplace can mean different things. Are you looking for:

Autocomplete, Word prediction software, to make it easier and faster to spell and write.
Autocorrect, automatic correction of spelling.
Shorthand, for practical use today, see Autocomplete.
Shorthand, history of different forms of shorthand methods, like stenography, etc..